The 900th "Kfir" Brigade (lit. "Lion Cub Brigade"), is the youngest and largest infantry brigade of the Israel Defense Forces. It is subordinate to the 340th "Idan" Armoured Division of Israel's Central Regional Command.

History 
In the 1990s the IDF formed the Designated Infantry Battalions (also known as the "90s Battalions") as auxiliary troops accompanying its armored forces. On December 6, 2005, these were unified into a single regular-service brigade commanded by Colonel Eyal Nosovski.

The brigade is currently deployed in the West Bank where its primary missions include counter-terror operations, apprehension of Palestinian militants, raids, patrols, manning checkpoints and regular security activities. Before Israel's 2005 disengagement from Gaza, Kfir units were also stationed in the Gaza Strip.
Members of this unit wear a camouflaged beret.

Structure 
Until 2008 the brigade's battalions were operatively attached to regional brigades of the West Bank Division. Since 2008 the battalions are only attached to West Bank brigades when operationally needed.

 90th Nahshon Battalion, previously assigned to Ephraim Brigade
 92nd , previously assigned to Etzion Brigade
 93rd , previously assigned to Shomron Brigade. In the beginning of the year 2017, this battalion has been closed and reopened as Sayeret Haruv, which is now the new sayeret (reconnaissance) unit related to Kfir
 94th , previously assigned to Binyamin Brigade
96th , previously assigned to Yehuda Brigade, was disbanded in July 2015.
 97th Netzah Yehuda Battalion (Formerly the Nahal Haredi Battalion)

Personnel 
Kfir recruits must complete 8 months of combat training in order to be received into active service. The first four months of training are dedicated to basic training in which the soldiers learn discipline and are introduced to physical fitness and various weapons. After basic training, they receive 3–4 months of advanced training in urban warfare, advanced weaponry, fighting from armored personnel carriers, chemical warfare and other challenges of today's battlefield.

In order to attract recruits to the brigade, the Israel Defense Forces decided that to join the elite Sayeret Oketz (Special K-9 unit) or Sayeret LOTAR (Special counter terrorism unit) recruits must choose Kfir as their first priority in the draft request form and during Tironut go through a selection process. Those who don't pass the selection process continue to serve in Kfir Brigade.

Weapons and Gear 
The Kfir Brigade uses the M4 Carbine

Memorial 
The brigade's memorial is situated in Afula. The left wing is inscribed with a Bible verse from 2 Samuel 1:23 and the right wing with a verse from Amos 3:4

Gallery

References 

Brigades of Israel
Military units and formations established in 2005
Central Command (Israel)
Infantry of Israel
2005 establishments in Israel